Fayerweather & Ladew was one of the oldest and largest leather manufacturers in the world. It was located in Glen Cove, Long Island.

History
The company was started in 1870 by Joseph B. Hoyt, Harvey Smith Ladew and Daniel B. Fayerweather as J. B. Hoyt & Co. Edward R. Ladew became a partner in 1877, and Joseph Harvey Ladew, Sr., became a partner in the company on February 1, 1889.

References

Manufacturing companies disestablished in 1905
Leathermaking
Glen Cove, New York
1905 disestablishments in New York (state)
Manufacturing companies established in 1870
1870 establishments in New York (state)
Ladew family